The Dawn of the Egyptian novel is a book written by the Egyptian novelist and writer Yahya Haqqi (17 January 1905 - 9 December 1992).

Content 

In the book “The Dawn of the Egyptian novel”, Yahya Haqqi chronicles modern Egyptian anecdotal art, writing about the novel "Zainab" by Mohammed Hussein Heikal and writes about Muhammad Taimur, Mahmud Tahir Lashin, Issa Obeid and Tawfiq al-Hakim. He also discusses Mahmud Tahir Haqqi’s novel "The Virgin of Dunshui" (original title:ʿḏrāʾ dnšwy) as well as "The Pen Paintings" as a tribute to the art of the short story, and among those who wrote "Pen paintings".

References 

Egyptian books
20th-century Arabic books
1960 books